is a railway station in the city of Tamura, Fukushima Prefecture, Japan, operated by East Japan Railway Company (JR East).

Lines

Station layout
The station has one side platform serving a single bi-directional track. The station is staffed.

History
Sugaya Station opened on October 10, 1948. The station was absorbed into the JR East network upon the privatization of the Japanese National Railways (JNR) on April 1, 1987.

Passenger statistics
In fiscal 2018, the station was used by an average of 69 passengers daily (boarding passengers only).

Surrounding area
 Sugaya Post Office
Abukuma-do

See also
 List of Railway Stations in Japan

References

External links

  

Stations of East Japan Railway Company
Railway stations in Fukushima Prefecture
Ban'etsu East Line
Railway stations in Japan opened in 1948
Tamura, Fukushima